The PZL TS-8 Bies (Devil) is a Polish trainer aircraft, used from 1957 to the 1970s by the Polish Air Force and civilian aviation.

Development
The aircraft was designed in response to a Polish Air Force requirement for a modern piston-engined trainer with a retractable tricycle landing gear to replace Junak 3 and Yak-11 aircraft. The main designer was Tadeusz Sołtyk – hence the designation letters TS. The plane was named Bies – a folk name for the devil. Work started in 1953 and the first prototype was flown on July 23, 1955. In 1956 and 1957 it beat three international records in its class. The second prototype was shown at the Paris Air Show in 1957.

In 1957 the first experimental series of 10 aircraft was produced by WSK-Okecie (designated as TS-8 BI). A slightly improved main variant, designated as the TS-8 BII, was produced from 1958 to 1960 by WSK Mielec. The last 10 machines, TS-8 BIII, were built with better avionics, in total 251 TS-8 were produced of which 229 were the TS-8 BII variant.

The TS-8 had good handling and performance; a noisy engine being one of its few flaws. It was the first really modern aircraft designed in Poland after the war, that also used a Polish engine.

Design
The TS-8 was an all-metal low-wing cantilever monoplane, with metal-covered semi-monocoque fuselage, oval in cross-section. The three-part single-spar wing, of semi-monocoque design, creating a transverse inverted gull wing "W" shape. It had a Tricycle retractable landing gear, and a 7-cylinder WN-3 radial engine in front, delivering 330 hp take-off power and 283 hp normal power to a 2.2 m diameter two-blade variable pitch wooden propeller.

The crew of two, sat in a tandem  enclosed cockpit, with twin controls, the student in front with the instructor in the rear. Canopy sections above the crewmen slid rearwards.

The plane had no armament, except for the experimental series TS-8 BI, which had one 12.7mm machine gun and two small bomb pylons.

Operational history
The TS-8s began to be withdrawn from Polish Air Force service in the mid-1960s, being replaced by PZL TS-11 Iskra jet trainers. Over 100 withdrawn aircraft were handed over to the civilian aviation (aero clubs). Most TS-8s were finally withdrawn from civilian aviation by 1978, with three currently remaining airworthy. Two TS-8s were used by Indonesia.

Variants

TS-8
3 prototypes.
TS-8 BI
First experimental series, 10 built.
TS-8 BII
Improved TS-8 BI. Main production version, 229 built.
TS-8 BIII
Version equipped with better avionics, 10 built.

Operators

Indonesian Air Force received two aircraft which were based in Bandung.

Polish Air Force
Polish Navy
Aeroklub Polski

Specifications

See also

References

External links

PZL aircraft
1950s Polish military trainer aircraft
1950s Polish civil trainer aircraft
Single-engined tractor aircraft
Low-wing aircraft
Aircraft first flown in 1955